This was the first edition of the tournament.

Anna Danilina and Lidziya Marozava won the title, defeating Kateryna Bondarenko and Katarzyna Piter in the final, 6–3, 6–2.

Seeds

Draw

Draw

References
Main Draw

WTA Poland Open - Doubles